Miotapirus harrisonensis is an extinct species of tapir lived during the early Miocene Epoch some 20 million years ago in North America.

Physically Miotapirus was virtually identical to its modern relatives; with a length of 2 m (6 ft 8 in) it was even the same size. Most likely it was also nocturnal and very adaptable.

References

Prehistoric tapirs
Miocene odd-toed ungulates
Miocene mammals of North America
Taxa named by Erich Maren Schlaikjer
Fossil taxa described in 1937